The 2014–15 Greek Basketball Cup competition was the 40th edition of the top-tier level professional national domestic basketball cup competition of Greece. The competition started on September 21, 2014, and ended on April 5, 2015.

Panathinaikos beat Apollon Patras by a score of 53–68 in the Greek Cup Finals, to win its fourth straight cup title, and 16th cup title overall. Panathinaikos' Loukas Mavrokefalidis was named the Greek Basketball Cup Most Valuable Player.

Format
The top six placed teams from the top-tier level Greek Basket League 2013–14 season, had an automatic bye to the quarterfinals. While the eight lower placed teams from the Greek Basket League 2013–14 season, along with the 14 teams from the 2nd-tier level Greek A2 Basket League 2014–15 season, played in preliminary rounds, competing for the other two quarterfinals places. The quarterfinals and onward rounds were played under a single elimination format.

Bracket

Quarterfinals

Semifinals

Final

Awards

Most Valuable Player

Finals Top Scorer

References

External links
 Official Hellenic Basketball Federation Site 
 Official Greek Basket League Site 
 Official Greek Basket League English website 

Greek Basketball Cup
Cup